Hakea fraseri, is a species of shrub or small tree commonly known as the corkwood oak, is a shrub in the family Proteaceae  and is endemic to northern New South Wales. It has furrowed bark, pendulous foliage and creamy-white flowers in spring.

Description
The branchlets are a whitish colour, covered with flattened, soft hairs, new shoots glossy rusty coloured hairs over glossy white hairs. Flowering occurs in spring.

Taxonomy and naming
This species was first formally described in 1830 Robert Brown and the description was published in Supplementum primum prodromi florae Novae Hollandiae. The specific epithet (fraseri) honours Charles Fraser the first colonial botanist and Superintendent of the New South Wales botanic gardens.

Distribution and habitat

References

fraseri
Flora of New South Wales